The 1967 Toledo Rockets football team was an American football team that represented the University of Toledo in the Mid-American Conference (MAC) during the 1967 NCAA University Division football season. In their fifth season under head coach Frank Lauterbur, the Rockets compiled a 9–1 record (5–1 against MAC opponents), tied with Ohio for the MAC championship, and outscored all opponents by a combined total of 266 to 83. After opening the season with a loss to Ohio, Toledo won nine consecutive games, part of a 12-game winning streak that extended into the 1968 season.

The 1967 defense was one of the toughest in program history.  In total defense, the team allowed 198.4 yards per game, the fourth best in program history. The scoring defense, at 8.3 points per game, ranks fifth in program history. The total of 12 touchdowns allowed ranks third in program history. In a game against Ohio, the Rockets did not allow a single rushing first down. The Rockets held Northern Illinois to -109 rushing yards, which remains a program record. The 13 punts by Northern Illinois also remains tied for a program record for most punts forced.

The team's statistical leaders on offense included John Schneider with 1,650 passing yards, Roland Moss with 833 rushing yards, and Pete Kramer with 556 receiving yards and 96 points scored. Schneider and Tom Beutler were the team captains.

Attendance at Toledo's home football games totaled 84,455 in 1967, an average of 14,076 per game.

Schedule

References

Toledo
Toledo Rockets football seasons
Mid-American Conference football champion seasons
Toledo Rockets football